Maria Lúcia Amaral is a Portuguese lawyer, university professor, politician and judge. She was vice-president of the Constitutional Court of Portugal and is Portugal's 10th Ombudsman, being the first woman to hold this post.

Early life
Maria Lúcia da Conceição Abrantes Amaral was born on 10 June 1957 in the city of Huambo, formerly known as Nova Lisboa in Angola, which was at the time a Portuguese colony. She graduated in law in 1980, from the Faculty of Law of the University of Lisbon, and obtained a master's in legal and political sciences in 1986 and a PhD in constitutional law in 1998 from the same faculty. While studying she was also working at Lisbon University and at the Catholic University of Portugal.

Career
After receiving a doctorate, Amaral pursued an academic career as a professor at the NOVA University Lisbon from 1998, becoming a full professor in 2008. She taught and also published a wide range of publications. In March 2007 she was elected as a judge of the Constitutional Court by the Assembly of the Republic and served on the court for nine years.  She was elected vice president by her fellow judges in October 2012. The court was involved in several notable constitutional issues, particularly relating to some of the austerity measures of the then government of Pedro Passos Coelho. Her attitude to the constitutionality of austerity, in which her broad view was that this was not a constitutional issue, often put her at odds with the other members of the court. 

In November 2017, Amaral took office as Portugal's Ombudsman. She was nominated by the Social Democratic Party (PSD) with the support of the governing Portuguese Socialist Party (PS). She received the necessary two-thirds majority of the House of Assembly, with only seven votes against. In her inaugural speech she promised "independence from power", "constant vigilance" and "firm obedience to the fundamental rights of the people".

Publications
Amaral is editor of the law journal, Themis, which is published by the NOVA University.. Among her many contributions to this and other journals are:

Questões Regionais e Jurisprudência Constitucional. In Estudos em Memória ao Professor Doutor João de Castro Mendes, LEX, Lisboa, 1996, pp. 511-532
Carl Schmitt e Portugal. O problema dos métodos em direito constitucional português. In Perspectivas Constitucionais, ed. Jorge Miranda, Coimbra Editora, Coimbra, 1996, pp. 167-194 
Responsabilidade civil extracontratual do Estado: a propósito do prazo de prescrição do direito à indemnização. Cadernos de Justiça Administrativa, n° 12, pp.31-38 
A Revisão Constitucional de 1997, sistema de actos legislativos – Opinião. Legislação, Cadernos de Ciência de Legislação, 19/20, Abril-Dezembro de 1997, pp. l05-121 
Dever de Legislar e Dever de Indemnizar. Themis, Ano I, n° 2-2000, pp.67-98 
Separação horizontal e separação vertical de poderes: funções do Estado e autonomia local. Cadernos de Justiça Administrativa, nº 24,2000, pp. 18-30 
O Estado de Direito Democrático Português. Estudos de Direito Constitucional, coordenador Rogério Nunes dos Anjos Filho, Jus Podivm, Salvador, Bahia, Brasil, pp. 393-416 
Um Povo de Homens e de Mulheres em país de Constituição débil. Ex aequo, Revista da Associação Portuguesa de Estudos sobre as Mulheres, nº 10 (Direito da Igualdade de Género, edited by Maria do Céu Cunha Rego), pp. 17-27 
O Princípio da Igualdade na Constituição da República Portuguesa. In Estudos em Homenagem ao Professor Doutor Armando Marques Guedes, Coimbra Editora, pp. 35-57 
Problemas da judicial review em Portugal. In Themis, Ano VI, n° 10, pp. 67-90 
Justiça Constitucional e Trinta Anos de Constituição. In Themis, 30 Anos da Constituição Portuguesa, 2006, pp. 145-153 
Queixas constitucionais e recursos de constitucionalidade. In Estudos Comemorativos dos 10 Anos da Faculdade de Direito da Universidade Nova de Lisboa, Almedina, Lisboa, 2008, pp. 473-499
O Princípio da Dignidade da Pessoa Humana na Jurisprudência Constitucional Portuguesa. In Liber Amicorum, José de Sousa e Brito; Estudos de Direito e Filosofia, Almedina, Coimbra, 2009, pp. 945-964

References

External links
with Amaral on the state broadcaster RTP

1957 births
Living people
University of Lisbon alumni
Ombudsmen in Portugal
Portuguese jurists